The Kalaako (Kalarko) were an Aboriginal Australian people of the Goldfields-Esperance region of Western Australia.

Country
It takes in Mount Monger, Golden Ridge, and Burbanks. Their western frontier is around the Bremer Range. The Johnston Lakes, Mount Holland, Barker Lake, Koongornin, Norseman and Salmon Gums all lie on what is Kalaako territory.

The tribes neighbouring the Kalaako are, clockwise from the north, the Maduwongga, the Tjeraridjal (n.e.), the Ngadjunmaia, the Njunga due south; the Wudjari, the Njakinjaki, and the Kalamaia to the northeast.

Alternative names
 Kalarko
 Malba (Wudjari exonym, meaning they were circumcised and subincised)

Source:

Notes

Citations

Sources

Aboriginal peoples of Western Australia
Norseman, Western Australia